The 9th Dallas–Fort Worth Film Critics Association Awards, honoring the best in film for 2003, were given on January 5, 2004. The organization, founded in 1990, includes 63 film critics for print, radio, television, and internet publications based in north Texas.

Top 10 films
The Lord of the Rings: The Return of the King (Academy Award for Best Picture)
Cold Mountain
Mystic River
Lost in Translation
Finding Nemo
American Splendor
In America
Big Fish
Master and Commander: The Far Side of the World
The Last Samurai

Winners

Best Actor: 
Sean Penn – Mystic River
Best Actress: 
Charlize Theron – Monster
Best Animated Film: 
Finding Nemo
Best Cinematography: 
The Lord of the Rings: The Return of the King – Andrew Lesnie
Best Director: 
Peter Jackson – The Lord of the Rings: The Return of the King
Best Documentary Film: 
Capturing the Friedmans
Best Film: 
 The Lord of the Rings: The Return of the King 
Best Foreign Language Film: 
City of God (Cidade de Deus), Brazil/France/United States
Best Supporting Actor: 
Alec Baldwin – The Cooler
Best Supporting Actress: 
Renée Zellweger – Cold Mountain
Worst Film: 
The Cat in the Hat

References

External links
Dallas-Fort Worth Film Critics Association official website

2003
2003 film awards